Carola Suárez-Orozco is a cultural developmental psychologist, academic, and author. She is a Professor in Residence at the Harvard Graduate School of Education, and the Director of the Immigration Initiative at Harvard. She is also the co-founder of Re-Imagining Migration, a nonprofit organization.

Suárez-Orozco has focused her research on immigrant children and youth with a particular attention on highlighting the experiences regarding educational contexts. She also works extensively to elucidate how the process of immigration affects immigrant children, adolescents, and young adults. She has authored or co-authored several winning books, including Transformations: Immigration, Family Life, and Achievement Motivation Among Latino Adolescents, Children of Immigration, Learning a New Land,  Immigrant-Origin Students in Community College, and Education: A Global Compact for a Time of Crisis.

Personal
After spending her early years being raised in Lausanne, Saurez-Orozco emigrated along with family to the United States at the age of 5.

She has been married to Argentine born anthropologist and academic Marcelo Suárez-Orozco since 1977 with whom she has written and collaborated with.

Education
Suárez-Orozco received her Bachelor's degree in Development Studies from the University of California, Berkeley in 1978, and a Master's degree in Clinical Psychology from John F. Kennedy University in 1980. She went on to enroll at the California School of Professional Psychology, in 1988. She completed her Clinical Internship in the Department of Psychiatry at the University of California, San Diego, earning her Doctoral degree in Clinical Psychology in 1993.

Career
Upon receiving her Doctoral degree, Suárez-Orozco held appointments as a school psychologist at Escondido Union School District as well as a guidance counselor at Cambridge Rindge and Latin School. In 1997, she became the Harvard Immigration Project Senior Research Associate in 2003. Following this appointment, she joined New York University’s Steinhardt School of Education as Associate Professor of Applied Psychology and Teaching & Learning in 2004, and later on became Professor of Applied Psychology in 2006. In 2012, she left New York University, and served as a Professor at the University of California, Los Angeles until 2022 and is now professor emeritus. She was appointed Professor in Residence at Harvard University Graduate School of Education in 2022 and directs the Immigration Initiative at Harvard. Since July 2022, she has been serving as Professor in Residence at Harvard University Graduate School of Education.

Research
Trained as a clinical psychologist, Suárez-Orozco's focuses her research on child, adolescent, and young adult experiences of immigration, while covering a broad range of topics including academic engagement and achievement, identity formation, family separations, civic engagement, and the unauthorized experience.

Suárez-Orozco has led several major studies in her career. An early seminal study includes the Longitudinal Student Adaptation Study (LISA) funded by the NSF, the Spencer, and William T. Grant Foundations. This longitudinal study which she ran out of the Harvard Immigration Project followed 400 immigrant newcomer young adolescents originating from China, Central America, the Dominican Republic, Haiti, and Mexico for 5 years. Drawing on diverse sources of information including yearly student interviews, parent interviews, school data, and observational data, the study elucidated predictors of educational adaptation. The study was foundational in pointing to the role of family separations, undocumented status, pre-migratory traumas, as well as varying school contexts in variations in trajectories of performance. The study led to multiple journal articles as well as the Harvard University Press book-- Learning a New Land: Immigrant Students in American Society.

She went onto to lead a study of immigrant origin young adults attending community colleges. Funded by the William T. Grant Foundation, the Research on Immigrants in Community College (RICC) study considered the experience of 646 immigrant community college students attending 3 community colleges in New York. The study served to shed light on the ways in which immigrant students navigate community colleges—the setting where they are most likely to initiate their higher educational journey. This mixed-methods study drew on ethnographic and survey data as well as extensive interview of students, faculty, and administrators and was the basis for the New York University Press volume (2019) volume—Immigrant-Origin Students in Community College: Navigating Risk and Reward in Higher Education.

In addition, in 2016, she was awarded a Lyle Spencer Foundation Grant to research the role of teacher enactments of bias in K-12 classrooms. She has also co-led a study, with Ford Foundation surveying over 900 undocumented college undergraduates across the country. Most recently she has led the Ford Foundation work entitled—"Bridging the Compassion Gap" Addressing Social Inclusion for Immigrant Origin Children & Youth.

In 2006, the American Psychological Association awarded her a Presidential Citation noting: "Whereas you have brought your skills to bear with remarkable effectiveness in a wide range of educational, policy making, and social contexts, cutting across a broad swath of behavioral and social sciences, and whereas, you have consistently approach work with immigrant populations from a perspective of strength and resilience, properly disposing of stereotyping and pathologizing approaches, now therefore the American Psychological Association recognizes and commends you for your distinguished contributions to our understanding of the health, well-being, and adjustment needs of immigrant children and their families."

Awards and honors
1996 – Best Book Award, Society for Research on Adolescence Social Policy 
2002 – Roberta Grodberg Simmons Prize Lecture, Society for Research on Adolescence 
2006 – Inducted into the New York Academy of Sciences
2006 – Presidential Citation, American Psychological Association
2007 – Virginia & Warren Stone Award, Harvard University Press’ Outstanding Book on Education and Society
2009 – Fellowship, Institute for Advanced Study
2010 to 2012 – Chair, American Psychological Association Presidential Task Force on Immigration 
2016 – Member, National Academy of Education
2016 – Award for Best Edited Book, Society for Research on Adolescence Social Policy
2018 – Award for Best Article, Society for Research on Adolescence Social Policy 
2019 – Undergraduate Mentoring Award, UCLA
2020 – Arthur W. Staats Prize Lecture for Unifying Psychology, American Psychological Association APA Division

Bibliography

Books
Transformations: Immigration, Family Life, and Achievement Motivation Among Latino Adolescents (1995) ISBN 9780804725514
Children of Immigration (2001) ISBN 9780674004924
La Infancia de la Inmigración (2003) ISBN 9788471124715
Understanding the Social Worlds of Immigrant Youth: New Directions for Youth Development (2004) ISBN 9780787972677
The New Immigration: An Interdisciplinary Reader (2005) ISBN 9780415949156
Històries d´immigració: la comprensió dels patrons de rendiment escolar dels joves immigrants nouvinguts (2008) ISBN 9788483349182
Learning a New Land: Immigrant Students in American Society (2008) ISBN 9780674026759
Frameworks and Ethics for Research with Immigrants: New Directions for Child and Adolescent Development (2013) ISBN 9781118769997
Transitions: The Development of Children of Immigrants (2015) ISBN 9780814770177
Immigrant-Origin Students in Community College: Navigating Risk and Reward in Higher Education (2019) ISBN 9780807761946
Education: A Global Compact for a Time of Crisis (2022) ISBN 9780231204354

Selected articles
Suárez-Orozco, C., Pimentel, A., & Martin, M. (2009). The significance of relationships: Academic engagement and achievement among newcomer immigrant youth. Teachers college record, 111(3), 712–749.
Suárez-Orozco, C., Rhodes, J., & Milburn, M. (2009). Unraveling the immigrant paradox: Academic engagement and disengagement among recently arrived immigrant youth. Youth & Society, 41(2), 151–185.
Suárez-Orozco, C., Gaytán, F. X., Bang, H. J., Pakes, J., O'Connor, E., & Rhodes, J. (2010). Academic trajectories of newcomer immigrant youth. Developmental psychology, 46(3), 602.
Suárez-Orozco, C., Yoshikawa, H., Teranishi, R., & Suárez-Orozco, M. (2011). Growing up in the shadows: The developmental implications of unauthorized status. Harvard Educational Review, 81(3), 438–473.
Suárez-Orozco, C. (2012). Identities under siege: Immigration stress and social mirroring among the children of immigrants. In The new immigration (pp. 149–170). Routledge.

References 

Year of birth missing (living people)
Developmental psychologists
University of California, Berkeley alumni
John F. Kennedy University alumni
University of California, San Diego alumni
Harvard Graduate School of Education faculty
Swiss women psychologists
Living people